Mohammad Aqa may refer to:
 Mohammad Aqa Aqajari, Khuzestan Province
 Mohammad Aqa-ye Olya, West Azerbaijan Province
 Mohammad Aqa-ye Sofla, West Azerbaijan Province